Addis Neger may refer to:

 Addis Neger (website), an Ethiopian daily news website
 Addis Neger (newspaper), an Ethiopian weekly newspaper